Toy Biz v. United States was a 2003 decision in the United States Court of International Trade that determined that for purposes of tariffs, Toy Biz's action figures were toys, not dolls, because they represented "nonhuman creatures". This decision effectively halved the tariff rate, from 12 percent tax to 6.8 percent.

Background
The Harmonized Tariff Schedule in U.S. law distinguished between two types of action figures for determining tariffs: dolls, which are defined to include human figures, and toys, which include "nonhuman creatures". Because duties on dolls were higher than those on toys, Marvel Comics subsidiary Toy Biz argued before the U.S. Court of International Trade, that their action figures (including the X-Men and Fantastic Four) represented "nonhuman creatures" and were subject to the lower tariff rates for toys instead of the higher ones for dolls. On January 3, 2003, after examining more than 60 action figures, Judge Judith Barzilay ruled in their favor, granting Toy Biz reimbursement for import taxes on previous toys.

Reaction
Because a common theme in Marvel Comics had been the struggle for mutants like the X-Men to prove their humanity, the case shocked numerous fans. Marvel responded to these concerns by claiming "our heroes are living, breathing human beingsbut humans who have extraordinary abilities ... A decision that the X-Men figures indeed do have 'nonhuman' characteristics further proves our characters have special, out-of-this world powers".

The Harmonized Tariff Schedule was amended to eliminate the distinction between dolls and other toys, which are now in the same category.

See also 
 Nix v. Hedden

References

2003 in case law
2003 in the United States
Action figures
Marvel Entertainment
United States Court of International Trade case law
Toy industry
X-Men